Jüri Pihl (17 March 1954 – 3 February 2019) was an Estonian politician, a member of the Social Democratic Party.

From 1993 to 2003 he served as the General Director of Kaitsepolitsei, the central security institution in Estonia. After that, from 2003 to 2005 he was the Attorney General of the Republic of Estonia.

From 5 April 2007 to 21 May 2009 he was the Minister of the Interior in the second cabinet of Prime Minister Andrus Ansip. He was dismissed when the Social Democratic Party decided to leave the coalition.

From 7 March 2009 to 16 October 2010 he was the Chairman of the Social Democratic Party.

References

External links
Profile at the Estonian Ministry of the Interior

1954 births
2019 deaths
People from Kuressaare
Recipients of the Military Order of the Cross of the Eagle, Class III
Leaders of political parties in Estonia
Ministers of the Interior of Estonia
Recipients of the Order of the White Star, 4th Class